Prelude may refer to:

Music
Prelude (music), a musical form
Prelude (band), an English-based folk band
Prelude Records (record label), a former New York-based dance independent record label
Chorale prelude, a short liturgical composition for organ using a chorale as its basis

Albums and songs
Prelude (EP), a 2017 EP by April
Prelude (Jack McDuff album), a 1963 album by jazz organist Brother Jack McDuff
Prelude (The Moody Blues album), 1987 album by The Moody Blues
Prelude (Deodato album), a 1973 album by Eumir Deodato
"Prelude", a song by Pete Townshend from All the Best Cowboys Have Chinese Eyes
"Prelude", a song by Flobots from Flobots Present... Platypus
"Prelude", a song by Killswitch Engage from Killswitch Engage (2000 album)
Preludes: Rare and Unreleased Recordings, an album by Warren Zevon
"Prelude", a song by the Sword from Used Future
"Prelude", a song by Hieroglyphics from Full Circle
Prelude, an EP by Lauren Jauregui

Musical works
'Prelude' is a very common term as a title of a musical piece, both classical and popular. Some specific preludes are:
Prélude à l'après-midi d'un faune, a popular orchestral piece by Debussy
Prelude in C-sharp minor (Rachmaninoff), an 1892 piano work by Sergei Rachmaninoff
Preludes (Chopin), a set of 24 piano pieces by Frédéric Chopin, written between 1835 and 1839
Préludes (Debussy), two books of piano pieces by Claude Debussy written between 1909 and 1913
Preludes (Kabalevsky), a set of 24 piano pieces, each based in a folk song
Preludes (musical), a 2015 musical by Dave Malloy
Les préludes, a symphonic poem by Franz Liszt

Literature
The Prelude, an epic poem by William Wordsworth
"Prelude" (short story), a short story by New Zealand author Katherine Mansfield
Prelude to Foundation, a 1988 novel in Isaac Asimov's Foundation series
Preludes (Dragonlance series), a series of novels comprising two trilogies set in the Dragonlance world
"Preludes" (poem), a poem by T. S. Eliot

Other uses
"Prelude" (Alias episode), in the TV spy drama series 
Prelude (yacht), a trailer sailer designed by Ian Proctor
Prelude FLNG, the world's largest floating liquefied natural gas platform
Prelude SIEM (Intrusion Detection System), an open source a security information and event management system
Haskell Prelude, a standard module imported by default into Haskell programs; see Haskell features
Honda Prelude, an automobile manufactured by Honda
Sheaffer Prelude, a series of  pens by the Sheaffer Pen company
The preludes, videos released on YouTube by Swedish band iamamiwhoami
Preludes (film series), shorts commissioned by the 2000 Toronto Film Festival 
Christmas Prelude, annual festival in Maine, U.S.